The Rey de Reyes (English: "King of Kings") is an annual tournament held by Lucha Libre AAA Worldwide (AAA) comparable to WWE’s King of the Ring tournament. For the first six tournaments the format consisted of four-way elimination matches with four qualifiers and a final, but in later tournaments the format changed. The winner is usually either currently one of the top faces or heels of the promotion or a wrestler that AAA is hoping to push to the main event position. The winner is presented with a sword, which some have carried with them for a full year. The event usually also features additional matches not related to the Rey de Reyes tournament.

List of Rey de Reyes

Rey de Reyes event history
The first Rey de Reyes event was held on February 21, 1997 at the Convention Center in Ciudad Madero, Tamaulipas, Mexico. Since then all Rey de Reyes events have been held in March each year. The 13 events have hosted 13 finals, with only one wrestler, La Parka, winning the tournament more than once, in 2001, 2003, 2005, and 2007. Ciudad Madero, Tamaulipas and Naucalpan, Mexico State are tied for most events hosted with five each. Beyond that, only Zapopan, Jalisco has repeated as host of the event. As is tradition with recent major AAA shows, the wrestlers compete inside a hexagonal wrestling ring and not the four sided ring the promotion uses for regular television events and House shows.

As of 2011 Rey de Reyes has seen six Luchas de Apuesta, or bet fights. A wrestler has been unmasked once, and five times a wrestler or wrestlers have had their hair shaved off as a result of losing the Apuesta match. The event has hosted eight championship matches, with four championships changing hands on the show, including the finals of the tournament to crown the first ever AAA World Tag Team Champions.

Dates, venues and main events

References

 
Recurring events established in 1997